The Northwest Conference is an OHSAA athletic league located in northwest Ohio and includes schools in Allen, Hardin,  Paulding, Putnam, and Van Wert counties. The NWC originally formed in 1947. The Northwest Conference currently awards championships in 10 Varsity sports: baseball, basketball, cross country, football, golf (boys), softball, soccer (girls), track, volleyball, and wrestling.

Current members

Former members

Membership Timeline

History

1947-1949
The Northwest Conference begins its inaugural season of competition in the fall of 1947 with the eight charter members: Columbus Grove, Delphos Jefferson, Elida, Forest, Lafayette-Jackson, Pandora-Gilboa, Lima Shawnee, and Spencerville.

1950-1959
1953: Shawnee leaves after the 1952-53 school year.
1953: Bluffton becomes a conference member beginning with the 1953-1954 school year.

1960-1969
1962: Forest is consolidated into Riverdale Local Schools who maintains membership in a different conference.
1962: Leipsic, in Putnam County, joins starting with the 1962-1963 school year.
1963: Ada, Lima Bath, and Ottawa-Glandorf join the conference.
1964: Leipsic leaves the conference in May. 
1965: Lafayette-Jackson consolidates with Harrod Auglaize Local to create Allen East.
1966: Bath and Pandora-Gilboa leave at the conclusion of the 1965-1966 school year.
1966: Lima Perry and Upper Scioto Valley join.
1967: Ottawa-Glandorf leaves at the conclusion of 1966-1967. North Baltimore and Paulding enter the conference at the beginning of the 1967-1968 school year.
1969: North Baltimore leaves in May. Lincolnview begins conference play in September.

Lincolnview entered conference for the 1965-66 season, basketball only. Lincolnview never fielded a football program.

1970-1979
1970: Crestview joins at the beginning of the 1970-1971 school year.
1972: Elida votes to leave the league. They subsequently begin play in the WBL in 1973.

1980-1989
1981: Crestview votes to no longer sponsor football at the conclusion of the 1981 season. They remain a conference member in all other sports.

1990-1999

2000-2009
2000: Crestview, having restarted their football program as an independent in 1999, officially starts play as a conference member again.
2002: Upper Scioto Valley, facing possible removal because of their failure to reliably field a football team during the 2001 season, opts to leave the conference at the conclusion of the 2001-2002 school year. They join the Northwest Central Conference beginning in 2003-2004.
2004: Lima Perry finishes its final year as a conference member after announcing their move to join USV in the NWCC in 2003.
2006: Lima Central Catholic begins play as a conference member after several years of petitioning.

2010-Present
2011: On December 1, the Lima Central Catholic administration announced that due to the results of being voted out of the NWC, they would leave the conference at the conclusion of 2012-2013. The move is made in part due to concerns from other conference members over fairness and competitive balance. A scheduling agreement agreed to before the announcement keeps LCC on NWC members' athletic schedules through the 2014-2015 school year unless there is a mutual decision between a conference member and LCC to break the agreement. As of September, 2013, Lima Central Catholic will remain an independent after unsuccessful negotiations with many other area conferences to become a member.
2012: Ada and Bluffton are asked to apply for membership in the expanding (and neighboring) Blanchard Valley Conference in March. both schools decline the BVC's invitation and remain members of the NWC. The BVC also invites North Baltimore and Hopewell-Loudon, who both accept.
2020: In response to Holgate leaving the Green Meadows Conference, the GMC invited former member Paulding to rejoin their league.  Paulding would accept their invitation and is expected to join after the 2020-21 school year.  With Paulding leaving, the NWC invited Blanchard Valley Conference/Putnam County League member Leipsic to join as a replacement, which is expected to join during the 2022-23 school year.  Leipsic will completely leave the BVC while maintaining their dual-membership with the PCL.

Notable Conference Rivalries
Ada & Allen East (Battle of Route 81)
Bluffton & Columbus Grove (Battle of 696)
Crestview & Lincolnview (Battle of Van Wert County)
Delphos Jefferson & Spencerville (Battle of Route 66)

Out of Conference Rivalries
Ada & Dola Hardin Northern
Allen East & Lima Bath
Bluffton & Cory-Rawson
Columbus Grove & Pandora-Gilboa
Crestview & Rockford Parkway
Delphos Jefferson & Delphos St. John's

per ohsaa schedules: Ada and Hardin Northern no longer play.

|}

Football Championships

By Year

Boys' Soccer  
Championships, by year (Boys' Soccer was introduced to the NWC in 2015)

Additional Information (as of 2019)

 Bluffton has never lost a game within the NWC.
 Ada and Allen East have frequently finished in 2nd and 3rd place.
 Across the previous 3 seasons, Ada has finished 2nd twice and 3rd once; Allen East has finished 2nd once and 3rd twice.
 Bluffton has earned NWC Boys' soccer Coach of the Year 5 out of 5 seasons, and Player of the Year 4 out of 5 seasons. (The remaining Player of the Year award, 2018, was awarded to Ada.)

External links 

 Northwest Conference Official Website

Ohio high school sports conferences